Dickens Hill is a fictional prison in the BBC soap opera EastEnders.  The prison is part of a storyline that first aired between 1988 and 1989. The storyline centres on the popular character Den Watts and was filmed on location at Dartmoor Prison in Devon. The episodes were shot in a block of intensive filming, over five weeks, but they were worked into regular episodes of EastEnders later in the year, from September 1988 to February 1989. This was done in order to keep the character Den Watts on-screen after Den's actor, Leslie Grantham, had left the show. Although not part of the original storyline, the prison also briefly appears in 2017 when Max Branning (Jake Wood) visits his former cellmate, Luke Browning (Adam Astill). The prison also appears in a separate storyline in 2018 when Mick Carter (Danny Dyer) is on remand for the shooting of Stuart Highway (Ricky Champ).

Storyline development
Two of the most successful and popular characters in the history of EastEnders have been pub landlords Den and Angie Watts, played by Leslie Grantham and Anita Dobson. They are original characters who both appear in the very first episode of EastEnders in February 1985, and were largely responsible for attracting the highest episode BARB rating for a UK soap opera, when 30.15 million viewers tuned in on Christmas Day 1986 to witness Den hand Angie divorce papers as a Christmas present.
However, by the beginning of 1988, actress Anita Dobson decided that she wanted to leave the serial. After over three years on-screen, the character departed in May 1988. Actor Leslie Grantham, who played Den, came to the decision around the same time that he too wanted to move on. He has commented, “I told them in November 1987 that I wanted to leave and Den had to die. It had to be final for both my sake and for the sake of the rest of the cast. After all, everything you seemed to read in the papers about EastEnders concerned 'Dirty Den'.” However, the executive producer of EastEnders, Julia Smith, didn't want the programme to suffer the “double blow” of losing both Den and Angie at the same time. The solution to the problem was one of the soap's "most complex and creative exercises" that required "intricate planning". The producers and writers came up with an idea to enable Den to stay as an on-screen presence into 1989, while keeping Grantham working on EastEnders only until the autumn of 1988. The story, which was conceptualised by scriptwriters Tony Holland and Bill Lyons, saw Den Watts imprisoned. The programme makers’ intention was to record the prison footage in a block of intensive filming, which would then be included in episodes of EastEnders for the rest of the year. Grantham has since said, "I agreed to a storyline about the jail sentence that would lead up to the end slowly, and allow new major stories to be developed. I’d always known that I didn’t want to play Den for twenty-five years. I didn’t want Den to end up another Ken Barlow, thanks very much.”

The programme makers did not want to turn Den into a criminal, however, so they decided that he had to be put in prison for a crime that could be justified to the viewing public — otherwise there would be no sympathy for him. The answer lay in a storyline that was running with another character — the rape of Kathy Beale (Gillian Taylforth) by James Willmott-Brown (William Boyde), which happens in July 1988. After simultaneously getting in too deep with a criminal organisation (The Firm), Den torches Willmott-Brown's wine bar, The Dagmar, as revenge for Willmott-Brown's rape of Kathy, wife of his friend Pete (Peter Dean), and is then forced to take the blame for the deed by “The Firm”. Den is taken away to a “safe house” in Manchester to avoid police arrest, but when it becomes clear that “The Firm” are planning to kill him, Den goes "on the run". He is eventually forced to turn himself in to the police in order to escape “The Firm’s” heavies. Den is put on remand at Dickens Hill prison in September 1988. For the next five months he is seen — in the company of a small group of new characters also confined in the prison — on a regular basis in EastEnders. Also in prison at the time is regular EastEnders character Nick Cotton (played by John Altman).

This material was shot in less than a month at Dartmoor Prison, Devon. When these segments were written and recorded, they were done so entirely in isolation, and in advance — the production team had no real idea of other material that would have to fit around it. The regular goings on in Albert Square had to fit convincingly around the pre-recorded Dickens Hill material; this “proved to be a major headache” for the programme makers. The Dickens Hill storyline has been referred to as a “soap-within-a-soap", and it “dominated” the majority of episodes that aired between the second half of 1988, and early 1989. Grantham has commented, “Banging Den up in Dartmoor – though we called it Dickens Hill – kept him alive for an extra year. It was the offer that the BBC made me, a brilliant idea, and I’m very grateful for it. I didn’t want to go in a way that harmed the show. This way I was able to record scenes for ninety episodes in five weeks. That must be a record. In the rest of the year I had time off...”

A new batch of characters was needed for the prison storyline. Den is joined by various inmates, each with their own back-story as to why they are in prison, including some who are connected to Den and his ongoing troubles with “The Firm”. Among the prisoners is "Barnsey" (played by actor John Hallam), who is Den's cellmate and strongest ally. Others include Queenie (John Labanowski), Vic (Michael Brogan), Trevor Kellow (Peter Doran), Squeaky (Phil Smeeton) and Elliot Brownlow (David James). In addition, a couple of more “familiar faces” joined Den in prison, including Johnny Harris (Michael O’Hagan), who had been seen various time before the airing of this storyline, and original character Nick Cotton. Nick had been a semi-regular character since the first episode of EastEnders, a renowned villain who Den has a tempestuous history with. Nick's presence provides Den with a link back to Albert Square.

It was while Nick is in prison that he admits to Den that he had killed Reg Cox, a character Den had found battered and dying in the first episode of the programme almost four years earlier. Nick had been prime suspect for the attack on Reg, but he was cleared of murder due to a lack of evidence and merely sentenced to probation for burgling Reg's home. The mystery of Reg Cox's murder is finally solved when Nick confesses to it in prison, “thinking that Dirty Den would be impressed”.

As well as the inmates, prison officers also become regulars for the duration of the storyline, such as officers Crane (Raymond Trickett), McLeish (Neil Daglish) and Stone (Jeremy Young). Outside the prison, members of the Firm were also heavily involved in Den's exit storyline, including Joanne Francis (Pamela Salem), the manager of Strokes; Gregory Mantel (Pavel Douglas); and Brad Williams (Jonathan Stratt), who had appeared intermittently since 1986, but is seen on a regular basis during this storyline. Investigating police officers included DS West (Leonard Gregory) and D.I.Bob Ashley (Robin Lermittee), who join Walford CID determined to close down the firm. Occasionally, regular characters from the Albert Square are seen to visit Den in prison, this includes Den's daughter Sharon (Letitia Dean), his friends Pete Beale, Pat Wicks (Pam St. Clement) and Joanne Francis, and even one of his worst enemies - Pauline Fowler (Wendy Richard).

The Dickens Hill storyline continues for the first two months of 1989, eventually climaxing in February. One by one the storylines of the specially brought in characters are concluded, until the date of Den's trial approaches. Den eventually bows out on 23 February 1989 in one of the programme's most famous episodes, which attracted over 20 million viewers on its first airing. After being abducted by the firm in an ambush on the way to his trial, Den escapes from their custody. He plans to flee the country after a rendezvous by a canal (in Alperton) with Michelle Fowler (Susan Tully), the mother of his illegitimate child, Vicki. This proves to be his downfall, as Michelle was followed by The Firm, and the episode ends with Den being shot by a man (who is carrying a gun concealed in a bunch of daffodils) and then falling into the canal. The scene where Den actually hit the water had to be taped at the BBC's Ealing Film Studios using a water tank, because the waters of the Grand Union Canal were deemed unsafe. When the episode was finished, however, Jonathan Powell, controller of BBC1, requested that the final shot be removed to allow for the possibility of Den returning at a later date.

In protest, Tony Holland and Julia Smith had their names taken off the episode's credits. Den's exit ended up being the creators' final contribution to the show. Grantham has since commented, “I was annoyed when I saw the death scene, and so was Julia Smith who’d directed it personally. Because I’d made it clear there would be no going back, I filmed Den collapsing from the bullet and tumbling into the canal. But all the viewers had was the sound of a shot and a splash; it was a deliberate tease. Julia was furious.”

Three weeks after Den is shot, police find spots of blood on the towpath along the section of canal where Den had been shot, but a search of the canal fails to uncover his body, although the police remain convinced that Den is dead and inform his daughter Sharon that this is a likely scenario.

A year later, Sharon finds a distinctive ring that had belonged to him for sale on a market stall in Albert Square. She speaks to a young boy who had given it to the market trader, and the boy says he'd fished it out of the canal. The police search the canal again and found a body, which is identified as Den's.

However, there had been much speculation as to whether Den really had been killed — particularly after the first search of the canal had failed to uncover a body. Eagle-eyed viewers would also have noticed that he was not wearing the ring retrieved from the canal before he was shot. The scene had been set for Den to eventually return to EastEnders, and as early as 1991 the show's producers offered Leslie Grantham the chance to return, but he rejected their offer. The return of Den was on the show's agenda for almost every year afterwards, but for the next decade Grantham was unwilling to return to the series — particularly at the time when none of Den's family were in it — and felt that a comeback at that stage would have merely been a ratings-booster. However, Grantham accepted an offer to return to the series in 2003 after 14 years away, only to be killed off again in February 2005.

It is eventually revealed that the body found in the canal in 1990 was that of Mr Vinnicombe, who had been killed by Jack Dalton (Hywel Bennett), a character who did not appear until 2003, after the latter had found out that Den survived the shooting.

Prisoners

Den Watts

After James Willmott-Brown (William Boyde) rapes Kathy Beale (Gillian Taylforth), Den Watts seeks retribution from his contacts with the criminal organisation known as The Firm. They refuse to get involved, but Den manipulates The Firm's errand boy, Brad Williams (Jonathan Stratt), and he and Den set fire to Willmott-Brown's wine bar, The Dagmar. It burns to the ground, but the Firm are not impressed with Den's disobedience. In order to prevent a police investigation, The Firm decide that Den has to take the blame for the arson. Den is offered £20,000 for every year he will spend in prison, but Den decides that the better option is to let the police think he is guilty and then go “on the run”. The Firm agree and Den is taken to a safe house in Manchester, where he is looked after by a woman named Christine, who Den is quick to seduce. However, when it becomes clear that The Firm are intending to kill Den to ensure his silence, he escapes. He visits a friend, Chalkie Whiting (Terry Molloy), who also lives in Manchester, but The Firm follow him and Den is forced to turn himself in to the police to escape them. Den is remanded at Dickens Hill prison in September 1988.

In Dickens Hill, Den is introduced to numerous prisoners; his cellmate Barnsey (John Hallam) becomes his closest ally. The police are desperate for Den to provide them information on The Firm, so they can close down their illegal operations. Den remains true to his word and refuses to “grass”; however the police are managing to get incriminating information on The Firm from somewhere. Assuming that Den is responsible, The Firm arrange for their contacts inside Dickens Hill to teach Den a lesson. The “number 1” of the cell block, Johnny Harris (Michael O'Hagan), orders his accomplice, Queenie (John Labanowski), to give Den a beating. Den is eventually cornered by the thugs and left bruised and battered with an injured arm. The Firm eventually discover that Den is innocent after all, and after Johnny Harris's departure, Den is instated as number 1 of the prison wing.

With The Firm under pressure from a police investigation, and various key players in the operation being arrested, they once again decide that Den is a liability. Den has taken out an "insurance policy" with his solicitor — papers the prove The Firm's guilt in various crimes— but this is eventually found by The Firm and destroyed, and they are then free to eliminate Den without repercussions. While Den is being accompanied by the police on the way to his trial in February 1989, The Firm apprehend the vehicle and abduct Den. Although Den manages to escape captivity with the help of Brad Williams, it is only a brief reprieve. Before fleeing the country Den arranges for a rendezvous at a canal with Michelle Fowler (Susan Tully), the mother of his daughter. Michelle tries to persuade Den to hand himself in to the police, promising that she and their daughter Vicki will be waiting for him when he gets out; however, Michelle has unwittingly been followed by The Firm. On the orders of Mr Mantel (Pavel Douglas), Den is shot by a man concealing a gun in a bunch of daffodils. A splash indicates that he had fallen into the canal, and he is presumed dead for over 14 years.

Nick Cotton

Nick is put on remand at Dickens Hill for drug dealing. He is given a cell with Barnsey (John Hallam), who openly dislikes him. He also makes an enemy out of Queenie (John Labanowski), due to a multitude of homophobic slurs. It is while he is in Dickens Hill that Nick confesses to an unimpressed Den that he is guilty of killing Reg Cox four years previously, who had been battered to death in the first episode of EastEnders in February 1985. He was cleared of murder but found guilty of burglary, having stolen items from Reg's home, and received a probation order.

Den and all the other prisoners frequently find Nick's presence an irritant. After being beaten by Barnsey, Nick applies for a cell swap, but he immediately regrets it when he is moved in with the even more abusive Queenie, who beats Nick several times, and then uses him as his skivvy; although Nick finds someone else to bully, the emotionally unstable Trevor Kellow (Peter Doran), who ends up committing suicide. Nick is denied bail, and is told by the magistrate that his trial is to be held in June 1989. His mother, Dot Cotton (June Brown), visits him occasionally, bringing him a regular supply of cigarettes. Following his trial, Nick is released and ordered to serve 240 hours of Community Service.

Johnny Harris

Johnny Harris (initially credited as Man, later Harris), played by Michael O'Hagan, is a criminal associate of Den Watts (Leslie Grantham), who shows up in Albert Square occasionally to liaise with Den about various scams they are involved with. He first appears in June 1987 to tell Den to implicate another suspect in order to exonerate the son of the Firm's boss, who has been arrested for drug dealing and that Den has no choice but to comply, which he does. Johnny is next seen in February 1988 when he manages to swindle local conman, Darren Roberts (Gary McDonald), by selling him fake pornographic videos.

In June 1988, Johnny reveals to Den that his latest scam has been uncovered by the police and it is likely that he will serve time in prison. Johnny is sent to Dickens Hill prison on remand, where he meets up with Den in September 1988, after he is imprisoned for the arson of the Dagmar winebar.

Johnny had been promoted to "number 1" of the prison wing (head prisoner), meaning he is in charge of issuing supplies to the other inmates and given a cell on his own. Johnny is also on the payroll of The Firm, and he is instructed to keep a close eye on Den in order to stop him stepping out of line. When The Firm suspect Den of being a "grass", they instruct Johnny to organise a beating for him as a reminder to keep quiet. Johnny does so with the help of his ally Queenie (John Labanowski). Although Johnny orders Den's beating, he takes no pleasure in seeing his former friend hurt.

When The Firm decide that Den is not the "grass" after all, Johnny tries to make peace with him. Before Johnny leaves Dickens Hill to attend his trial, he arranges for Den to take over his position of "number 1". Johnny also informs Den that he suspects Queenie of being the police informant, which Den later proves. Two years after Den's supposed death at the hands of the Firm, Johnny appears in Walford after being asked by Den's adoptive daughter, Sharon Watts (Letitia Dean) to provide information on her fiancée Grant (Ross Kemp) and his brother Phil Mitchell (Steve McFadden). He informs Sharon of the criminal activities that the brothers and their late father Eric (George Russo) have been involved in and tells her they are bad news. She goes on to marry Grant anyway, and eventually marries Phil many years later after her marriage to Grant ends in divorce and her second husband Dennis Rickman (Nigel Harman) is murdered.

Barnsey Barnes

"Barnsey" Barnes, played by John Hallam, is the initial cellmate of Den Watts (Leslie Grantham) at Dickens Hill prison. He is serving time on remand for GBH and he and Den soon become friends.

When Den is branded a "grass", all the prisoners turn against him except Barnesy, who serves as his protector while others, such as Queenie (John Labanowski), attempt to attack him. In order to get to Den the other prisoners need to get rid of Barnsey, so they report him to the prison guards for a crime he did not commit. Barnsey is sent to solitary confinement for the night and the following day, Den is given a severe beating.

When Den is promoted to the "number 1" of the prison wing (head prisoner), he is given a cell on his own. Barnsey's new cellmate turns out to be Nick Cotton (John Altman), who he instantly dislikes. After Barnsey attacks his new cellmate, Nick applies for a cell move, though he instantly regrets it, as he is moved in with Queenie.

Barnsey stands trial in January 1989, and leaves Dickens Hill to await his fate. Den is deeply sorry to see him go. Den is shot in February 1989 and presumed dead. A body is wrongly identified as Den's the following year, and Barnes attends the funeral in May 1990 and encounters Nick, who is also in attendance.

Queenie Price

Michael "Queenie" Price, played by John Labanowski is a prisoner, who is serving a sentence in Dickens Hill prison along with Den Watts (Leslie Grantham). He goes by the name of Queenie because he is an effeminate homosexual. The other prisoners refer to him as "she" rather than "he", despite the fact that he is a large, butch looking man, with a moustache. Although Queenie acts in a camp manner, he is actually tough and the other prisoners know not to mess with him. Nick Cotton (John Altman) often gets on his wrong side due to his homophobic slurs, and he is eventually given a beating because of this.

It is revealed that Queenie is on The Firm's payroll along with another prisoner, Johnny Harris (Michael O'Hagan). When The Firm believe that Den is trying to frame them, Queenie and Harris seek Den out, intending to give him a severe beating. Den eludes this for a while, but Queenie and his gang eventually corner him, leaving him bruised and battered with a fractured arm.

After The Firm discover Den is not the informant, he begins to suspect that it is Queenie. Den concocts a plan to catch him out. He gives him the false name of a drug dealer and as he predicts, it isn't long before the police are questioning Den about him, confirming that Queenie is the "grass". Den stuns Queenie with his discovery, but instead of turning him in to The Firm he uses him to provide information on them.

Trevor Kellow

Trevor Kellow, played by Peter Doran, is an inmate at Dickens Hill prison. Originally from the north of England, Trevor has been imprisoned on remand for the mugging of an old lady. It is the second time he has been imprisoned for this offence, though he claims to be innocent this time.

Because the other prisoners, Barnsey (John Hallam) in particular, feel that Trevor's crime is despicable, they immediately take against him. They begin to bully him mercilessly. Trevor looks to Den Watts (Leslie Grantham) for support, and although he seems sympathetic, he can do little to stop the bullying. He manages to prevent a few attacks, but the abuse of Trevor still continues behind his back.

In 1989 Trevor's friend contacts him with new evidence that proves he is not guilty of the mugging. However, the following month his friend disappears with the evidence, meaning he has no chance of avoiding a prison sentence. His solicitor instructs him to plead guilty to the crime to ensure a shorter sentence, but Trevor feels he cannot cope with imprisonment for a crime he didn't commit. His mental health swiftly deteriorates and he becomes depressed, morose and severely paranoid.

Shortly after, Trevor is found dead in his cell, having hanged himself on the morning of his trial. Den is disturbed to discover that Trevor died in vain, as his solicitor had uncovered evidence to exonerate him.

Victor Hampton

Victor "Vic" Hampton, played by Michael Brogan, is an inmate at Dickens Hill prison. He is imprisoned on remand for the theft of antique furniture. Vic is married to a woman named Gillie (Clare James), but the marriage has come under strain due to Vic's continuous infidelities. Gillie visits and expresses her concerns about Vic's promiscuity. She asks him to get tested for any STDs that he may have picked up.

When the prison officers find out about Vic's concerns he is quarantined in isolation, as they fear he could spread diseases to the other prisoners. Vic is tested and is told by the prison chaplain that he is HIV positive. He becomes severely depressed and berates himself for giving the virus to his wife. He talks of the humiliation he feels, having the entire prison know about his condition, being segregated from the other prisoners and treated like a leper. He talks about the dreams he had for the future, which will now have to be forgotten. Gillie is supportive and Vic is relieved to discover that she has actually tested negative. She promises to stay with him no matter what.

Victor is the first character in EastEnders to be diagnosed as HIV positive, paving the way for the controversial virus to feature in a storyline surrounding a much higher profile character - Mark Fowler (Todd Carty) - a couple of years later.

Others

Ms. Martin

Ms. Martin, played by Karen Archer, is The Firm's solicitor who is employed to defend Den Watts' (Leslie Grantham) who is incarcerated in Dicken's Hill on remand for Arson.

Gillie Hampton

Gillie Hampton, played by Clare James, is the messy-haired wife of prisoner Victor (Michael Brogan), who is in prison on remand for theft. The couple have a young son. Gillie comes to Dickens Hill prison to visit Vic. Their marriage has come under strain due to Vic's adulteries. Gillie had been visited by one of Vic's partners and she begins to fear that Vic has unwittingly passed on an STD to her. She had blood tests to put her mind at rest and pleads with Vic to do the same.

Vic eventually does and it turned out he is HIV positive. He is deeply sorry that he has passed the disease on to his innocent wife, but to his relief she informs him that she has tested negative. She is supportive and promises to stay with him no matter what.

See also
List of fictional prisons

References

External links
 BBC Xmas 88 - Den in prison

EastEnders storylines
EastEnders locations
Fictional prisons
1988 in British television